The 2017 Southern Steel season saw the Southern Steel netball team compete in the 2017 ANZ Premiership and the 2017 Netball New Zealand Super Club. With a team coached by Reinga Bloxham, captained by Wendy Frew and featuring Gina Crampton, Jhaniele Fowler-Reid, Shannon Francois, and Jane Watson, Steel finished the 2017 season as inaugural ANZ Premiership winners. After finishing the regular season unbeaten and as minor premiers, Steel defeated Central Pulse 69–53 in the grand final. This saw Steel complete a 16 match unbeaten ANZ Premiership season. Steel remained unbeaten as they went onto win the inaugural Netball New Zealand Super Club tournament, defeating Northern Mystics 79–58 in the final. This saw Steel finish the season with 21 wins and zero defeats.

Players

Player movements

2017 roster

Pre-season
Ahead of the 2017 season, Steel appointed Reinga Bloxham as their new head coach. During the pre-season, Steel played three series of two matches against Noeline Taurua's Sunshine Coast Lightning, Mainland Tactix and their own National Netball League team, Netball South. They also played three matches at the official ANZ Premiership pre-season tournament at Te Wānanga o Raukawa in Ōtaki.

ANZ Premiership regular season

Fixtures and results
Round 1
 
Round 2

Round 3

Round 4

Round 5

Round 6

Round 7

Round 8

Round 9

Round 10

Round 11
 
Round 12

Steel's perfect season was almost derailed on 12 June when a van with six of their players on board was involved in a road traffic accident in Fendalton, Christchurch. Four of the players were injured. Wendy Frew received over seventy stitches and under went surgery while Te Paea Selby-Rickit suffered a dual fractured rib. Shannon Francois and Jhaniele Fowler-Reid had minor injuries. Just two days later, on 14 June, Steel notched up win number 14 of the season against Mainland Tactix. Sophie Erwood, Olivia Bates, Dani
Gray and Aliyah Dunn were seconded from Steel's National Netball League team, Netball South. Despite been 41–38 down after three quarters, Steel launched a comeback in the fourth quarter to win 51–46.

Round 13

Final standings

ANZ Premiership Finals Series

Grand final

Netball New Zealand Super Club

Group stage

 

Final ladder

1st/4th Play offs
Semi-finals

Final

Award winners

New Zealand Netball Awards

References

2017
2017 ANZ Premiership season
2017 in New Zealand netball